Memory of a Night of Love (Arabic: ذكري ليلة حب, French: Souvenir d'une Nuit d'Amour, translit: Thikra Laylat Houbb or Zekra Lailat Hubb) is a 1973 Syrian film starring Salah Zulfikar, Nelly, Nabila Ebeid, and directed by Seif El-Dine Chawkat.

Plot 
On the outskirts of Beirut, Anwar lives happily with his heart-sick wife, Laila, and one day meets his ex-girlfriend Camelia, who works as a dancer. About Anwar and others, the wife is shocked, and Anwar is arrested. Will his friend the police officer find the real killer?

Crew 

 Writer: Seif El-Dine Chawkat
 Director: Seif El-Dine Chawkat
 Produced by: Al Furat for Cinema
 Distribution: Lebanese Andalusian Films (Abbas Nasser - Sobhi Al-Nouri)
 Soundtrack: Suhail Arafa
 Cinematographer: Ahmed Abu Saeda
 Editor: Saheb Haddad

Cast 

 Salah Zulfikar as Anwar Kayali
 Nelly as Laila
 Nabila Ebeid as Camellia
 Rafiq Subaie as Abu Sayyah
 Ziad Mawlawi as Abdo
 Mariam Fakhr Eddine as (Guest appearance)
 Muna Wassef as Baheeja
 Hala Shawkat
 Khaled Taja
 Huda Shaarawy

Supporting cast 

 Nadia Arslan
 Maha Al-Saleh
 Anwar al-Baba
 Ahmed Addas
 Youssef Choueiri
 Sabah Obaid
 Shakir Barikhan
 Mohammed Al-Shamat
 Ahmed Rafee
 Hisham Al-Masry
 Adeeb Shehadeh
 Adnan Ajlouni
 Mohamed Tariqi
 Ziad Al-Qirbi
 Khaled Abu Saada

See also 
 Arab cinema
 Salah Zulfikar filmography

References

External links 

 Zekra Lailat Hubb on elCinema

 

1973 films
Syrian drama films